Rhegmatophila ricchelloi is a moth of the family Notodontidae. It is found in Sardinia.

The wingspan is about 17 mm. The moth flies in July.

The larvae feed on Prunus spinosa and Quercus ilex.

Sources 
 P.C.-Rougeot, P. Viette (1978). Guide des papillons nocturnes d'Europe et d'Afrique du Nord. Delachaux et Niestlé (Lausanne).

Notodontidae
Endemic fauna of Italy